Helen Cecilia De Silver Abbott Michael (December 23, 1857 – November 29, 1904) was an American scientist who was among the first to "in a systematic way study the relation of chemical composition to species of plants and to plant growth." Michael theorized that the chemical composition of plants over the course of their development provided an illustration for the theory of evolution. She also was a student of Tufts, and later Harvard, and worked with organic chemist Arthur Michael (known for the Michael reaction), who she subsequently married.

Life and work

Helen Cecilia De Silver Abbott was born in Philadelphia in 1857 to James Abbott and Caroline Montelius. Helen originally focused on being a pianist, studying extensively under the guidance of Miss Mary F. Howell.  But in 1881, upon returning to America after performing in Paris, she turned to science after purchasing a copy of Helmholtz's Treatise on Physiological Optics. The scientific thoughts engulfed her and thus began her interest in optics and physics.  At the time, she also began an interest in zoology.

In the fall of 1882, Helen, after exploring more areas of science, became absorbed in medicine and entered into the Women's Medical College of Pennsylvania.  Her determination and social position of her affluent family allowed her to study alongside well-known physicians and professors in Pennsylvania.  During her second year of medical school, Helen was forced to withdraw from the school due to her poor health sustained from a serious fall.  While recovering, Helen shifted her interests towards research, and in particular, the chemical analysis of plants and topics in plant chemistry.  After an incident in which some children ingested poisonous roots, she developed and pursued an interest in the chemical properties of plants, and their origin, aided by self-study, travel, and family connections.

During the summer of 1887, Helen traveled throughout the European continent to visit with many accomplished scientists and to explore present possibilities for women's higher education.  She visited laboratories and institutions in Sweden, Switzerland, Germany, and Britain.  The scientists received Helen well due to the letter of introduction she had in her possession from Samuel Langley, secretary of the Smithsonian Institution. When she returned to America in late 1887, she came to Boston and began research   
at the chemistry laboratory of Professor Henry Trimble of the Philadelphia College of Pharmacy and later with Professor Arthur Michael of Tufts University, whom she married in 1888.  Shortly after their marriage, they set off on a tour around the world, exploring many cultures.  The couple returned to America in 1890, and Arthur accepted a position of director of the Chemical Laboratory at Clark University in Worcester, Massachusetts.  In 1891, Helen and Arthur then moved to the English coastal town of Bonchurch on the Isle of Wight for several years, doing chemical research in a private, self-equipped laboratory.  Helen's work from this laboratory produced four published papers regarding synthetic organic chemistry.

On their return to the United States four years later, Helen Abbott Michael began studying 
the stereochemistry of sugar molecules.  In 1895, she gave a presentation before the Franklin Institute on a review of synthetic work of sugars  Soon after, Helen again began studying medicine at the Tufts University School of Medicine in 1900, earning an M.D. degree in June 1903.  She established a hospital for the poor, where she practiced medicine, but then died the following year from influenza, contracted from one of her patients. She was buried at Laurel Hill Cemetery in Philadelphia (section W-111).

Michael predicted in a lecture on "Plant Analysis as an Applied Science" that chemists of the future would be able to produce, through synthetic means, the proteins, sugars, and starches needed in the human diet.  She also held that during a plant's development, changes in its chemical composition  provided an illustration of the theory of evolution.

Selected writings
  - Contains reprints of many of Helen Abbott Michael's papers, along with an extensive biographical sketch

In 1886, she reviewed the first U.S. exhibition of Impressionism under the pseudonym "Helen Sabbrin."

Activities and honors
 American Philosophical Society (1887)
 American Association for the Advancement of Science
 Franklin Institute of Philadelphia
 Deutsche Chemische Gesellschaft (Berlin)

References

Further reading

External links
 
 
 

1857 births
1904 deaths
Tufts University School of Medicine alumni
American chemists
Physicians from Philadelphia
Scientists from Philadelphia
Deaths from influenza
Infectious disease deaths in Pennsylvania
Burials at Laurel Hill Cemetery (Philadelphia)
American women scientists
Members of the American Philosophical Society